There have been five Dunbar Baronetcies; the first four in the Baronetage of Nova Scotia, and the last in the Baronetage of the United Kingdom. There is also a Hope-Dunbar Baronetcy of Baldoon.

The Dunbar baronets of Mochrum are notable as the 11th Baronet held that title for only two days before his death. The Dunbar baronets of Hempriggs are notable as the 8th Baronetess was one of only four (or possibly five) baronetesses in history; i.e. the title passes to heirs whomsoever rather than heirs male.

The Dunbar baronets of Northfield have lived at the Duffus estate, Duffus, Elgin, since the 17th century.

Dunbar of Mochrum (29 March 1694)

The baronetcy was created for James Dunbar of Mochrum, Wigtownshire on 29 March 1694

 Sir James Dunbar, 1st Baronet (died 1718)
 Sir George Dunbar, 2nd Baronet (died 1747)
 Sir James Dunbar, 3rd Baronet (died 1782)
 Sir George Dunbar, 4th Baronet (died 1799)
 Sir George Dunbar, 5th Baronet (–1811)
 Sir William Rowe Dunbar, 6th Baronet (1776–1841)
 Sir William Dunbar, 7th Baronet (1812–1889)
 Sir Uthred James Hay Dunbar, 8th Baronet (1843–1904)
 Sir William Cospatrick Dunbar, 9th Baronet (1844–1931)
 Sir James George Hawker Roland Dunbar, 10th Baronet (1862–1953)
 Sir Richard Sutherland Dunbar, 11th Baronet (1873–1953), a photographer's artist, first cousin once removed of Sir James Dunbar, 10th Baronet. He held the title for only two days before his death; issue two daughters.
 Sir Adrian Ivor Dunbar, 12th Baronet (1893–1977), who was working as a handyman in Upper Fairmount, Maryland before inheriting the title from his first cousin.
 Sir Jean Ivor Dunbar, 13th Baronet (1918–1993)
 Sir James Michael Dunbar, 14th Baronet (born 1950)

Dunbar of Durn (29 January 1698) 
The baronetcy was created for William Dunbar of Durne Fordyce, Banffshire on 29 January 1698.

 Sir William Dunbar, 1st Baronet (died c. 1710)
 Sir James Dunbar, 2nd Baronet (1668–1737)
 Sir William Dunbar, 3rd Baronet (died 1786)
 Sir James Dunbar, 4th Baronet (died 1812)
 Sir Robert Dunbar, 5th Baronet (1780–1813)
 Sir William Dunbar, 6th Baronet (1804–1881)
 Sir Drummond Miles Dunbar, 7th Baronet (1845–1903)
 Sir George Alexander Drummond Dunbar, 8th Baronet (1879–1949)
 Sir Drummond Cospatrick Ninian Dunbar, 9th Baronet (1917–2000)
 Sir Robert Drummond Cospatrick Dunbar, 10th Baronet (born 1958)

Dunbar of Northfield (10 April 1700) 
The baronetcy was created for William Dunbar of Hempriggs, Caithness on 10 April 1700.

 Sir William Dunbar, 1st Baronet (died 1711)
 Sir Robert Dunbar, 2nd Baronet (died 1742)
 Sir Patrick Dunbar, 3rd Baronet (c. 1676–1763)
 Sir Archibald Dunbar, 4th Baronet (c. 1693–1769)
 Sir Alexander Dunbar, 5th Baronet (1742–1791)
 Sir Archibald Dunbar, 6th Baronet (1772–1847)
 Sir Archibald Dunbar, 7th Baronet (1803–1898)
 Sir Archibald Hamilton Dunbar, 8th Baronet (1828–1910)
 Sir Charles Gordon-Cumming-Dunbar, 9th Baronet (1844–1916)
 Sir Archibald Edward Dunbar, 10th Baronet (1889–1969)
 Sir Archibald Ranulph Dunbar, 11th Baronet (1927–2015)
 Sir Edward Horace Dunbar, 12th Baronet (b. 1977)

Dunbar of Hempriggs (21 December 1706)
The baronetcy was created for Hon. James Dunbar, formerly Sutherland, of Hempriggs, Caithness on 10 or 21 December 1706.

 Sir James Dunbar, 1st Baronet (died 1724) a younger son of James Sutherland, 2nd Lord Duffus and his wife Lady Margaret Mackenzie. He was Shire Commissioner for Caithness in the Parliament of Scotland 1706-07 and for Caithness in the British House of Commons 1710–13. He married Elizabeth Dunbar, daughter and heiress of Sir William Dunbar, 1st Baronet, and had issue, the male line in remainder to the Lords Duffus until succeeding in 1827 and falling extinct in 1875.
 Sir William Dunbar, 2nd Baronet (died 1793). He married three times. By his third wife Henrietta Rose, daughter of Hugh Rose, 16th of Kilvarock, he had a son and heir:
 Sir Benjamin Dunbar, 3rd Baronet (1761–1843) also claimed to be 6th Lord Duffus from 1827 although his rights were not established by the House of Lords despite his petition 1838;. He married Janet Mackay, and was succeeded by his son
 Sir George Sutherland Dunbar, 4th Baronet (1799–1875), also claimed to be 7th and last Lord Duffus. The title then passed to a nephew
 Sir Benjamin Duff Dunbar, 5th Baronet (1808–1897)
 Sir George Duff-Sutherland-Dunbar, 6th Baronet (1878–1962)
 Sir George Cospatrick Duff-Sutherland-Dunbar, 7th Baronet (1906–1963)
 Dame Maureen Daisy Helen Dunbar, 8th Baronetess (1906–1997)
 Sir Richard Francis Dunbar, 9th Baronet (born 1945)

Dunbar of Boath (19 September 1814) 

 Sir James Dunbar, 1st Baronet (1770–1836)
 Sir Frederic William Dunbar, 2nd Baronet (1819–1851)
 Sir James Alexander Dunbar, 3rd Baronet (1821–1883)
 Sir Alexander James Dunbar, 4th Baronet (1870–1900)
 Sir Frederick George Dunbar, 5th Baronet (1875–1937)

See also
 Hope-Dunbar baronets

References

External links
 
Daniel J.J. Sutherland. "A Short History of Clan Sutherland, The Families of Sutherland, Forse and Duffus, 12th–19th century". Retrieved 15 March 2009.

Baronetcies in the Baronetage of Nova Scotia
Extinct baronetcies in the Baronetage of the United Kingdom
1694 establishments in Nova Scotia
1814 establishments in the United Kingdom
Baronetcies created with special remainders